Seyyed Javad Tabatabai (14 December 1945 – 28 February 2023) was an Iranian philosopher and political scientist. He was Professor and Vice Dean of the Faculty of Law and Political Science at the University of Tehran.

Biography
Tabatabai, an Iranian Azeri, was born on 14 December 1945 in Tabriz, Iran. His father was a merchant in Bazaar of Tabriz. After pursuing studies in theology, law and philosophy in Tabriz and Tehran, he earned his PhD in political philosophy from the University of Paris 1 Pantheon-Sorbonne, with a dissertation on Hegel's political philosophy.

After coming to Iran, he was professor and deputy dean of the Faculty of Law and Political Science at the University of Tehran. In the 1990s, he was dismissed from his post as professor and deputy dean of the law school for criticizing the ideology of the Iranian government.

Then, he continued his research in other countries such as France, England, Germany and the United States: he was a guest fellow at the Wissenschaftskolleg zu Berlin, as well as at the Moynihan Institute of Global Affairs at Syracuse University. Tabatabai published around twenty books on the history of political ideas in Europe and Iran. On 14 July 1995, in France, he was decorated as a Knight of the Ordre des Palmes Académiques.

Tabatabai died on 28 February 2023 in Irvine, California, at the age of 77.

Views
Tabatabai, a leading theorist and historian of political thought in Iran, presented a controversial theory regarding the causes of the decline of political thought and society in Iran over the last few centuries. His ideas on Iranian decline have affected the intellectual debates on modernity and democracy currently underway in Iran. Tabatabai's career-long research revolved around this question: “What conditions made modernity possible in Europe and led to its abnegation in Iran?” He answered this question by adopting a “Hegelian approach” that privileged a philosophical reading of history on the assumption that philosophical thought is the foundation and essence of any political community and the basis for any critical analysis of it as well. In 2001, in an interview with Libération, he said that political and ideological Islam is already dead, because they have no plans for modernity.

Tabatabai rejected anti-Iranian irredentism and warned about the perils facing Iran from the provocations of pan-Turkism. Tabatabai defended Persian as Iran's national language and argued that the histories of Turkey and the Republic of Azerbaijan are ridden with forgeries and fabrications (see also: Pan-Turkism#Pseudoscientific theories). During one of his lectures in Tabriz, he emphasized that the history of the "Baku Republic" (i.e. the Republic of Azerbaijan) is central to the history of Iran.

Awards
 Ordre des Palmes Académiques - Paris (1995)
 Farabi International Festival - Tehran

Books
 Introduction to the History of Political Thought in Iran
 Decline of Political Thought in Iran
 Essay on Ibn Khaldun: Impossibility of Social Sciences in Islam
 Nizam al-Mulk and Iranian Political Thought: Essay on the Continuity of the Iranian Thought
 On Iran: An Introduction to the Theory of Decline of Iran
 On Iran: Tabriz School and Basis of Modernity
 On Iran: The Theory of Constitutionalism in Iran

References

External links

 Biography of Javad Tabatabai
 Javad Tabatabi's website (in Persian) 

1945 births
2023 deaths
Iranian writers
Political philosophers
University of Tehran alumni
University of Paris alumni
Academic staff of the University of Strasbourg
20th-century Iranian philosophers
Academic staff of the University of Tehran
Syracuse University faculty
Chevaliers of the Ordre des Palmes Académiques
People from Tabriz
Farabi International Award recipients
Farabi scholars
Iranian political philosophers